Vincent De Camp (1777-1839) was a British stage actor.

Of Austria background, he was the younger brother of the actress Maria Theresa Kemble. He first appeared at Drury Lane in 1792, and joined the company in 1794. He also appeared regularly at the Haymarket Theatre. From 1814 he appeared in provincial theatres and then emigrated to North America where he died, possibly in Texas.

References

Bibliography
 Cox, Jeffrey N. & Gamer, Michael. The Broadview Anthology of Romantic Drama. Broadview Press, 2003.
 Highfill, Philip H, Burnim, Kalman A. & Langhans, Edward A. A Biographical Dictionary of Actors, Actresses, Musicians, Dancers, Managers, and Other Stage Personnel in London, 1660-1800. Volume 14. SIU Press, 1973.

18th-century English people
English male stage actors
British male stage actors
18th-century English male actors
18th-century British male actors
1777 births
1839 deaths